Charles Strickland Standish (March 1790 – 10 June 1863) was a British Whig politician.

Standish was first elected a Whig Member of Parliament for Wigan at the 1837 general election, and held the seat until 1841 when he was defeated. However, after an election petition unseated Thomas Bright Crosse, he was again returned for the seat, holding it until 1847 when he did not seek re-election.

References

External links
 

UK MPs 1837–1841
UK MPs 1841–1847
Whig (British political party) MPs for English constituencies
1790 births
1863 deaths